is a Japanese singer, model, and music producer. She is a former member of the idol groups SKE48 and AKB48, where she was a member of Team S and Team 4, respectively. She is the producer of the Nagoya-based idol group Onegai! Full House, which debuted in September 2021.

Career 
Kitagawa passed SKE48's 6th generation auditions on January 1, 2013. Her debut was on February 28, 2013. Her debut stage performance was on April 20, 2013, at SKE48's Kenkyuusei Stage. In July 2013, together with Mako Kojima, Nana Okada, Miki Nishino, Nagisa Shibuya, Meru Tashima and Mio Tomonaga, they formed the sub-unit Tentoumu Chu!. Kitagawa's first SKE48 Senbatsu was for the single Sansei Kawaii!.

In February 2014, during the AKB48 Group Shuffle, it was announced that Kitagawa would be promoted to SKE48's Team S. On November 2, 2014, during SKE48's Request Hour Setlist Best 242 2014, SKE48's 16th single 12 Gatsu no Kangaroo was performed and Kitagawa and Ami Miyamae were the centers. This is the first time Jurina Matsui is not the center.

Kitagawa held a concurrent position in AKB48's Team 4 from March 26, 2015. On May 18, 2018, it was terminated.

Kitagawa's lightstick colours are pink, purple and pink.

Post-SKE48 
Kitagawa is the producer of the idol group Onegai! Full House, which debuted on September 12, 2021.

On November 2, 2021, Kitagawa released her first photobook, titled  and photographed in Shinojima, Aichi Prefecture.

Discography

SKE48 singles

AKB48 singles

Appearances

Stage units
SKE48 Kenkyuusei Stage 
 ""
 ""
 ""
 ""
SKE48 Kenkyuusei Stage 
 
SKE48 Team S 3rd Stage  (Revival)

TV variety
 AKBingo!
  (2014)

TV dramas
  (2014)

External links
 SKE48 Official Profile
 Official Blog
 Ryoha Kitagawa on Google+

References

1998 births
Living people
Japanese idols
Japanese women pop singers
Musicians from Aichi Prefecture
SKE48 members